The following outline is provided as an overview of and topical guide to Meghalaya:

Meghalaya – state in north-east India. The name means "the abode of clouds" in Sanskrit. The state is the wettest region of India, recording an average of 12,000 mm (470 in) of rains a year.[6] About 70% of the state is forested.[8] The Meghalaya subtropical forests ecoregion encompasses the state; its mountain forests are distinct from the lowland tropical forests to the north and south. The forests are notable for their biodiversity of mammals, birds, and plants.

General reference

Names 
 Common English name: Meghalaya
 Pronunciation:
 
 ;
 Official English name(s): Meghalaya
 Nickname(s): 
 Adjectival(s): Meghalayan
 Demonym(s): Meghalayans

Rankings (amongst India's states) 

 by population: 23rd
 by area (2011 census): 23rd
 by crime rate (2015): 22nd
 by gross domestic product (GDP) (2014): 24th
by Human Development Index (HDI): 
by life expectancy at birth: 
by literacy rate:

Geography of Meghalaya 

Geography of Meghalaya
 Meghalaya is: an Indian state, and one of the Seven Sister States
 Population of Meghalaya: 3,211,000 (2014)
 Area of Meghalaya: 22,429 km2 (8,660 sq mi) 
 Atlas of Meghalaya

Location of Meghalaya 
 Meghalaya is situated within the following regions:
 Northern Hemisphere
 Eastern Hemisphere
 Eurasia
 Asia
 South Asia
 India
 Northeast India
 Seven Sister States
 Time zone:  Indian Standard Time (UTC+05:30)

Environment of Meghalaya

Natural geographic features of Meghalaya

Regions of Meghalaya

Ecoregions of Meghalaya

Administrative divisions of Meghalaya

Districts of Meghalaya 

 Districts of Meghalaya

Municipalities of Meghalaya 

 Cities of Meghalaya
 Capital of Meghalaya: Capital of Meghalaya

Demography of Meghalaya 

Demographics of Meghalaya

Government and politics of Meghalaya 

Politics of Meghalaya

 Form of government: Indian state government (parliamentary system of representative democracy)
 Capital of Meghalaya: Capital of Meghalaya
 Elections in Meghalaya

Union government in Meghalaya 
 Rajya Sabha members from Meghalaya
 Meghalaya Pradesh Congress Committee
 Indian general election, 2009 (Meghalaya)
 Indian general election, 2014 (Meghalaya)

Branches of the government of Meghalaya 

Government of Meghalaya

Executive branch of the government of Meghalaya 

 Head of state: Governor of Meghalaya, 
 Head of government: Chief Minister of Meghalaya,

Legislative branch of the government of Meghalaya 

Meghalaya Legislative Assembly

Judicial branch of the government of Meghalaya 

 High Court of Meghalaya
 Chief Justice of Meghalaya

Law and order in Meghalaya 

 Law enforcement in Meghalaya
 Meghalaya Police

History of Meghalaya 

History of Meghalaya

History of Meghalaya, by period

Prehistoric Meghalaya

Ancient Meghalaya

Medieval Meghalaya

Colonial Meghalaya

Contemporary Meghalaya

History of Meghalaya, by region

History of Meghalaya, by subject

Culture of Meghalaya 

Culture of Meghalaya
 Architecture of Meghalaya
 Cuisine of Meghalaya
 Monuments in Meghalaya
 Monuments of National Importance in Meghalaya
 State Protected Monuments in Meghalaya
 World Heritage Sites in Meghalaya

Art in Meghalaya 

 Music of Meghalaya

People of Meghalaya

Religion in Meghalaya 

Religion in Meghalaya
 Christianity in Meghalaya

Sports in Meghalaya 

Sports in Meghalaya
 Cricket in Meghalaya
 Meghalaya Cricket Association
 Football in Meghalaya
 Meghalaya football team

Symbols of Meghalaya 

Symbols of Meghalaya
 State animal:
 State bird:
 State flower:
 State seal: Seal of Meghalaya
 State tree:

Economy and infrastructure of Meghalaya 

 Tourism in Meghalaya

Education in Meghalaya 

Education in Meghalaya
 Institutions of higher education in Meghalaya

Health in Meghalaya 

Health in Meghalaya

See also 

 Outline of India

References

External links 

 
 Tourism of Meghalaya (Official)
 

Meghalaya
Meghalaya